Sopa Intasen is a paralympic athlete from Thailand competing mainly in category T53 sprint events.

Biography
Sopa has competed in four Paralympics winning four medals.  He competed in the 2000 Summer Paralympics in the 200m and 400m as well as winning a silver medal in the 100m and as part of the Thai 4 × 400 m relay team won a second silver and won a gold medal as part of the 4 × 400 m relay team.  His future Paralympics proved unsuccessful  in that in the next two games he was unable to win any further medals despite competing in a total of seven events.

References

Sopa Intasen
Athletes (track and field) at the 2000 Summer Paralympics
Sopa Intasen
Sopa Intasen
Living people
Medalists at the 2000 Summer Paralympics
Medalists at the 2012 Summer Paralympics
Athletes (track and field) at the 2004 Summer Paralympics
Athletes (track and field) at the 2008 Summer Paralympics
Athletes (track and field) at the 2012 Summer Paralympics
Year of birth missing (living people)
Paralympic medalists in athletics (track and field)
Sopa Intasen
Medalists at the 2010 Asian Para Games
Medalists at the 2014 Asian Para Games
Sopa Intasen